Staghorn may refer to:

The Horn (anatomy) of a stag
Staghorn calculus, a type of kidney stone
Staghorn coral, a branching coral
Rhus typhina, a shrub commonly called Staghorn sumac
Lycopodium clavatum, a moss commonly called Staghorn moss
Platycerium, a fern commonly called Staghorn fern
Pacific staghorn sculpin, a type of fish
Staghorn (He-Man), an action figure from the Mattel
Struvite, a type of kidney stone, also referred to as Staghorn calculus